Acqueville is a former commune in the Calvados department in the Normandy region of northwestern France. On 1 January 2019, it was merged into the new commune of Cesny-les-Sources.

The inhabitants of Acqueville are known as Acquevillais or Acquevillaises.

Geography
Acqueville is located some 25 km south of Caen and 10 km east of Thury-Harcourt. It lies in a flat farming area on the D157 road which runs south from Cesny-Bois-Halbout through the centre of Acqueville south to join the D6 which forms the southern border of the commune.  The north-western border of Acqueville is formed by Highway D23 while the north-eastern border is Highway D156.  In the east and west the border is formed by several country roads. Apart from the village there are the hamlets of L'Outre in the west, Puant in the east, and Le Buisson in the south-west.

The Ruisseau de Bactot flows through the commune from south-west to north-east where it continues to join the Laize north-east of Moulines.

Toponymy
Acqueville was called Akevilla in 1204: the German or Scandinavian anthroponym Aki or Aka, and in Latin a "rural villa".

Administration
List of Successive Mayors of Acqueville

Mayors from 1939

The council was composed of eleven members, including the mayor and two deputies.

Population

Culture and heritage

Civil heritage
The commune has a number of buildings and structures that are registered as historical monuments:
A Farmhouse at Puant (1760)
The Chateau de la Motte (1614 and 1694)
The Park of the Chateau de la Motte (16th century)
A Farmhouse at la Cour Fontaine (18th century)
A Farmhouse (1783)
A House (18th century)
Houses and Farms (17th to 19th centuries)
A Manor House (15th century)

Religious heritage

The commune has two religious buildings and structures that are registered as historical monuments:
The Church of Saint-Aubin (13th century)
A Cemetery Cross at the Church of Saint-Aubin (18th century)

Bibliography
Arcisse de Caumont, Monumental Statistics of Calvados, Ed. Hardel, Caen, 1850, Pages 564-567

See also 
 Communes of the Calvados department

External links
Acqueville on the community of communes website 
Acqueville on Géoportail, National Geographic Institute (IGN) website 
Acqueville on the 1750 Cassini Map

Notes and references

Notes

References

Former communes of Calvados (department)
Populated places disestablished in 2019